The University of Louisiana Monroe (ULM) is a public university in Monroe, Louisiana. It is part of the University of Louisiana System.

History

ULM opened in 1931 as Ouachita Parish Junior College. Three years later it became the Northeast Center of Louisiana State University. In 1936 and 1937, its dean was Stephen A. Caldwell.

Its name changed again in 1949, to Northeast Junior College of Louisiana State University. A year later, it became an autonomous four-year institution as Northeast Louisiana State College. In 1969, it granted doctoral degrees for the first time and was elevated to university status as Northeast Louisiana University (NLU).

In 1999, NLU was renamed to its present name (ULM).

21st century

A 2002 "Reclaim Our Campus" effort targeted recovery from financial and auditing difficulties.

In 2010, James Erwin Cofer Sr., left the ULM presidency after eight years to head Missouri State University in Springfield, Missouri. He was succeeded by Nick Bruno as the eighth president of ULM.

Academics

Department of Atmospheric Science
The Atmospheric Science program at ULM offers the only 4 year Meteorology program in the state of Louisiana. ULM's Atmospheric Science program is the only undergraduate only program with a Polarimetric Doppler Weather Radar.

College of Business
The College of Business and Social Sciences (CBSS) seeks to prepare students for productive careers and responsible citizenship. The college benefits students, businesses and the community through research and service. ULM seeks excellence in business education by offering a student-centered learning environment that produces high-quality graduates and by engaging in research and service that benefits students, business and the community. ULM offers AACSB accredited undergraduate and graduate MBA degree programs.

Marriage & Family Therapy
Master's in marriage and family therapy is accredited by both the Commission on Accreditation for Marriage and Family Therapy Education and The Council for Accreditation of Counseling and Related Educational Programs. A doctoral program in marriage and family therapy was approved by the Louisiana Board of Regents, June 1995.

College of Pharmacy
Established in 1956, the College of Pharmacy is accredited by the American Council on Pharmacy Education, including one of seven Toxicology programs in the U.S. In 2007, the College of Pharmacy moved from the main campus to the off-campus (Bienville) building. There are satellite campuses in Shreveport and Baton Rouge.

The College of Pharmacy at ULM is Louisiana's only publicly supported comprehensive center for pharmaceutical education, research, and service. The college includes several modern specialized instructional and health service facilities and numerous affiliated off-campus teaching hospitals and pharmacies throughout the state.

In 1999, Milburn E. Calhoun, a New Orleans physician, philanthropist, and Pelican Books publisher endowed the million-dollar Mary E. and Darrell L. Calhoun Chair in Pharmacology, named for his late parents.

Theater Arts
ULM is home to the Emy-Lou Biedenharn Recital Hall, named for the opera singer and daughter of the Coca-Cola entrepreneur Joseph A. Biedenharn.

Natural History Museum
The university's Natural History Museum was home to the 6-million-specimen Neil Douglas fish collection and the 500,000-specimen R. Dale Thomas plant collection. In March 2017, museum staff announced that they had been told the collections would have to be divested to enable an expansion of the university's stadium, and that any specimens which had not been relocated to other institutions by July 2017 would be destroyed. The specimens were subsequently distributed to other institutions, with the plant collection going to the Botanical Research Institute of Texas, the herpetological collection to the University of Texas at Arlington, the entomological collection to Mississippi State University, and the ichthyological collection to Tulane University.

Campus gallery

Rankings
U.S. News & World Report as of 2015 ranks University of Louisiana at Monroe as follows:

Regional Universities (South) – 81st
Best Undergraduate Business Programs – 338th
Top Public Schools (South Regional Universities) – 39th
Pharmacy School – 74th
Speech Pathology – 181st
Best Online Bachelor's Programs – 160th
Best Online Graduate Business Programs – 87th
Best Online Graduate Education Programs – 103rd

Athletics

Major sports
Teams participate in NCAA Division I (Division I FBS for football). ULM joined the Sun Belt Conference for all sports on July 1, 2006, after playing in the Southland Conference in all sports except football (swimming and diving team was in Sun Belt Conference, but was dropped in 2005).

ULM moved from Division I-AA (now Division I FCS) to Division I-A (now FBS) in 1994 and played as a I-A independent 1994–2000. It became a football-only Sun Belt Conference member in 2001 and joined as a member in all sports in 2006. ULM shared the 2005 Sun Belt Conference football championship with Arkansas State University and the University of Louisiana–Lafayette (ASU received the conference's New Orleans Bowl bid due to tiebreaking procedures). Also, in 2012, ULM had their first winning season as an FBS school going, 8–5, and a bid to the 2012 Independence Bowl in Shreveport vs. the Ohio Bobcats, but lost 45–14.

ULM basketball coaches have included Arnold R. Kilpatrick, Lenny Fant, and Mike Vining. Fant was the first ULM coach to win three hundred games. Current head coach Keith Richard is a former point guard and alumnus from ULM.

Since being in the Sun Belt, the Warhawks have won conference titles in men's basketball (2006–07 West Co-Champion) and baseball (2008 regular season and 2012 conference tournament).

The ULM football team posted its first six-win season since moving to Division I-A in 2007 going 6–6, which included a 21–14 victory at Alabama. On September 8, 2012, ULM beat number 8 Arkansas 34–31 in overtime to become the first Sun Belt Conference team to beat a top ten SEC team. This was their second ever win against a ranked opponent after defeating number 20 Richmond 14–8 in Monroe in 1973.

The football and baseball stadiums and ULM Activities Center were designed by architect Hugh G. Parker of Bastrop.

Other activities
ULM is home to several award-winning groups including the Sound of Today marching band and the competition cheerleading squad.

The ULM water ski team is the most successful in the history of the collegiate sport, having won 28 National Collegiate Water Skiing Association championships since 1979. In that year, Bayou Desiard was the host site of the national competition.

Greek life

ULM recognizes the following active fraternities and sororities.

Notable alumni

Some of University of Louisiana at Monroe notable alumni include:

Businessmen: Tim Brando, Moon Griffon, Marc Swayze, Willie Robertson, Rob Redding, and Joey Arbogast
Entertainers: Tim McGraw
Football players: Chris Harris, Marty Booker, Stan Humphries, Stepfret Williams, Jimmy Edwards, Joe Profit, Roosevelt Potts, Bubby Brister, and Doug Pederson, head coach of the Jacksonville Jaguars and formerly the Philadelphia Eagles
Baseball players: Wayne Causey, Ben Sheets, Terry Mathews and Chuck Finley.
Politicians: Mike Walsworth and Jamie Mayo.
Basketball players: Kristy Curry and Calvin Natt.

Notes

References

External links

ULM Athletics website

 
University of Louisiana at Monroe
Educational institutions established in 1931
Universities and colleges accredited by the Southern Association of Colleges and Schools
Education in Ouachita Parish, Louisiana
1931 establishments in Louisiana
University of Louisiana at Monroe